Pollux is the brightest star in the constellation of Gemini. It has the Bayer designation β Geminorum, which is Latinised to Beta Geminorum and abbreviated Beta Gem or β Gem. This is an orange-hued, evolved giant star located at a distance of 34 light-years, making it the closest giant to the Sun. Since 1943, the spectrum of this star has served as one of the stable anchor points by which other stars are classified. In 2006 an extrasolar planet (designated Pollux b or β Geminorum b, later named Thestias) was confirmed to be orbiting it.

Nomenclature 

β Geminorum (Latinised to Beta Geminorum) is the star's Bayer designation.

The traditional name Pollux refers to the twins Castor and Pollux in Greek and Roman mythology. In 2016, the International Astronomical Union organized a Working Group on Star Names (WGSN) to catalog and standardize proper names for stars. The WGSN's first bulletin of July 2016 included a table of the first two batches of names approved by the WGSN, which included Pollux for this star.

Castor and Pollux are the two "heavenly twin" stars giving the constellation Gemini (Latin, 'the twins') its name. The stars, however, are quite different in detail. Castor is a complex sextuple system of hot, bluish-white type A stars and dim red dwarfs, while Pollux is a single, cooler yellow-orange giant. In Percy Shelley's 1818 poem Homer's Hymn to Castor and Pollux, the star is referred to as "... mild Pollux, void of blame."

Originally the planet was designated Pollux b. In July 2014 the International Astronomical Union launched NameExoWorlds, a process for giving proper names to certain exoplanets and their host stars. The process involved public nomination and voting for the new names. In December 2015, the IAU announced the winning name was Thestias for this planet. The winning name was based on that originally submitted by theSkyNet of Australia; namely Leda, Pollux's mother. At the request of the IAU, 'Thestias' (the patronym of Leda, a daughter of Thestius) was substituted. This was because 'Leda' was already attributed to an asteroid and to one of Jupiter's satellites.

In the catalogue of stars in the Calendarium of al Achsasi al Mouakket, this star was designated Muekher al Dzira, which was translated into Latin as Posterior Brachii, meaning the end in the paw.

Physical characteristics 

At an apparent visual magnitude of 1.14, Pollux is the brightest star in its constellation, even brighter than its neighbor Castor (α Geminorum). Pollux is 6.7 degrees north of the ecliptic, presently too far north to be occulted by the Moon. The last lunar occultation visible from Earth was on 30 September 116 BCE from high southern latitudes.

The star is larger than the Sun, with about two times its mass and almost nine times its radius. Once an A-type main-sequence star, Pollux has exhausted the hydrogen at its core and evolved into a giant star with a stellar classification of K0 III. The abundance of elements other than hydrogen and helium, what astronomers term the star's metallicity, is uncertain, with estimates ranging from 85% to 155% of the Sun's abundance.

Evidence for a low level of magnetic activity came from the detection of weak X-ray emission using the ROSAT orbiting telescope. The X-ray emission from this star is about 1027 erg s−1, which is roughly the same as the X-ray emission from the Sun. A magnetic field with a strength below 1 gauss has since been confirmed on the surface of Pollux; one of the weakest fields ever detected on a star. The presence of this field suggests that Pollux was once an Ap star with a much stronger magnetic field. The star displays small amplitude radial velocity variations, but is not photometrically variable.

Planetary system 
Since 1993 scientists have suspected an extrasolar planet orbiting Pollux, from measured radial velocity oscillations. The existence of the planet, Pollux b, was confirmed and announced on June 16, 2006. Pollux b is calculated to have a mass at least 2.3 times that of Jupiter. The planet is orbiting Pollux with a period of about 590 days.

References

External links 

 
 
 

K-type giants
Suspected variables
Planetary systems with one confirmed planet

 
Geminorum, Beta
2990
Durchmusterung objects
Geminorum, 78
62509
037826
0286
Pollux